Elachista turkensis is a moth in the family Elachistidae. It was described by Traugott-Olsen in 1990. It is found in Turkey.

References

Moths described in 1990
turkensis
Moths of Asia